The Leckner Ach, also called the Lecknerbach, is a river of Voralberg, Austria and of Bavaria, Germany.

See also
 List of rivers of Austria
 List of rivers of Bavaria

References 

Rivers of Bavaria
Rivers of Vorarlberg
Rivers of Austria
Rivers of Germany
International rivers of Europe